The following is a list of members of the United States House of Representatives from the state of New York. For chronological tables of members of both houses of the United States Congress from the state (through the present day), see United States congressional delegations from New York. The list of names should be complete as of August 23, 2022, but other data may be incomplete.

Current members of the U.S. House of Representatives
 : Nick LaLota (R) (since 2023)
 : Andrew Garbarino (R) (since 2021)
 : George Santos (R) (since 2023)
 : Anthony D'Esposito (R) (since 2023)
 : Gregory Meeks (D) (since 1998)
 : Grace Meng (D) (since 2013)
 : Nydia Velázquez (D) (since 1993)
 : Hakeem Jeffries (D) (since 2013)
 : Yvette Clarke (D) (since 2007)
 : Dan Goldman (D) (since 2023)
 : Nicole Malliotakis (R) (since 2021)
 : Jerry Nadler (D) (since 1992)
 : Adriano Espaillat (D) (since 2017)
 : Alexandria Ocasio-Cortez (D) (since 2019)
 : Ritchie Torres (D) (since 2021)
 : Jamaal Bowman (D) (since 2021)
 : Mike Lawler (R) (since 2023)
 : Pat Ryan (D) (since 2022)
 : Marc Molinaro (R) (since 2023)
 : Paul Tonko (D) (since 2009)
 : Elise Stefanik (R) (since 2015)
 : Brandon Williams (R) (since 2023)
 : Nick Langworthy (R) (since 2023)
 : Claudia Tenney (R) (since 2021)
 : Joseph Morelle (D) (since 2018)
 : Brian Higgins (D) (since 2005)

List of members 
The list of names should be complete, but other data may be incomplete.

See also 

New York's congressional districts
United States congressional delegations from New York
List of United States senators from New York
Elections in New York

Notes

External links 
 Biographical Directory of the U.S. Congress

New York
United States rep